The first Godmanis cabinet was the government of Latvia from 7 May 1990 to 3 August 1993. It led  Latvia to a restoration of its independence from the Soviet Union and was the first of two governments to be led by Ivars Godmanis, who was also Prime Minister from 2007 to 2009. It took office on 7 May 1990. It was replaced by the Birkavs cabinet on 3 August 1993, after the June 1993 election.

See also
 1990 Latvian Supreme Soviet election

Government of Latvia
1990 establishments in Latvia
1993 disestablishments in Latvia
Cabinets established in 1990
Cabinets disestablished in 1993